Betty Amongi Akena, (née Betty Amongi Ongom), but commonly known as Betty Amongi, is a Ugandan politician. She is the Minister of Gender, Labour and Social Development in the Cabinet of Uganda, as of 9 June 2021. Previously, she served as the Cabinet Minister of Kampala Capital City and before that, from 6 June 2016 until 14 December 2019, she served as the Minister of Lands, Housing and Urban Development in Uganda's cabinet. She is also the incumbent member of parliament representing the Oyam South Constituency in the 11th Parliament (2021 to 2026).

Background and education
Betty Amongi was born in Oyam District, Lango sub-region, in the Northern Region of Uganda, on 15 November 1975. In 1996, she entered Makerere University, graduating with a Bachelor of Arts in political science and public administration. Later in 2009, she was awarded a Master of Arts in International relations and Diplomatic studies.

Career
Betty Amongi was first elected to parliament in 2001 as the woman member of parliament for Oyam district and was re-elected in 2006 before being elected as the woman member for parliament for Oyam South in 2011 and 2016. In a surprise move following the 20 February 2016 presidential and parliamentary elections, President Yoweri Museveni of the ruling National Resistance Movement political party, named her Minister of Lands, Housing and Urban Development, despite her affiliation to the opposition Uganda People's Congress.

In a cabinet reshuffle on 14 December 2019, she was named cabinet minister of Kampala Capital City, switching dockets with Beti Kamya-Turwomwe, who took over at Lands, Housing and Urban Development.

In June 2021, Amongi was appointed Minister of Gender, Labour and Social Development in the new cabinet.

Personal
On 6 April 2013, Betty Amongi married Jimmy Akena, the member of Parliament for Lira Municipality and president of the opposition Uganda People's Congress. Jimmy Akena is the son of Milton Obote, the two-time former Prime Minister and President of Uganda. The traditional marriage took place in Minakulu sub-county, Oyam District and was attended by 32 members of parliament. President Yoweri Museveni, a friend of the couple, also attended the wedding.

See also
 Cabinet of Uganda
 Parliament of Uganda

References

External links
Website of the Parliament of Uganda
Betty Amongi, Obote’s Maruzi Country Deserves Much Better 
Mini Bio
Brief Biography

Living people
Oyam District
People from Oyam District
21st-century Ugandan women politicians
21st-century Ugandan politicians
Members of the Parliament of Uganda
Government ministers of Uganda
Northern Region, Uganda
1975 births
Lango people
Makerere University alumni
Women government ministers of Uganda
Women members of the Parliament of Uganda